Grigol Jomartidze Stadium is a multi-use stadium in Khashuri, Georgia.  It is used mostly for football matches and was the home stadium of FC Iveria Khashuri. The stadium is able to hold 10,000 people.

See also 
Stadiums in Georgia

References

Sports venues in Georgia (country)
Football venues in Georgia (country)
Buildings and structures in Shida Kartli